Madan Mahal Station (station code: MML) is the second main railway station of Jabalpur city of Madhya Pradesh.

History 

It comes under West Central Railway zone and is 3 km away from the zonal headquarters at Jabalpur which serves as the headquarters for West Central Railways. Many Express and Passenger trains halt in Madan Mahal station.

The station is maintained with all basic facilities and carries a heavy passenger load. It comes in the Itarsi–Jabalpur route and has connectivity to almost all the major places. It is one of the first pink railway stations of India.

Gallery

References 

Railway stations in Jabalpur district
Transport in Jabalpur
Jabalpur railway division
Buildings and structures in Jabalpur